Nasi kerabu is a Malaysian cuisine rice dish, a type of nasi ulam, in which blue-colored rice is eaten with dried fish or fried chicken, crackers, pickles and other salads. The blue color of the rice comes from the petals of Clitoria ternatea (butterfly-pea) flowers (bunga telang), which are used as a natural food coloring in cooking it. The rice can also be cooked with plain white rice or rice cooked using turmeric.  It is often eaten with solok lada (stuffed peppers) and is also eaten with fried keropok.

Nasi kerabu is very popular in the east coast states of Peninsular Malaysia such as Kelantan and Terengganu, and now can be found throughout Malaysia as well as in southern Thailand, where it is known as khao yam.

Origin and distribution

Boiled rice has been a key source of carbohydrates in the diet of the people of Malacca and Malay Archipelago since ancient times, and is an essential component of many local dishes. Most often, a portion of rice boiled in water, coconut milk or a mixture of both, is served with some kind of garnish. In Malaysia, as in many other East Asian kitchens, rice is usually not a side dish, but the basis of the dish. The role of a side dish is performed by more or less significant additions to a serving of rice. Accordingly, the names of such dishes usually contain the word "nasi" - "cooked rice" in Malay, as well as some definition or addition, consistent with the peculiarities of cooking rice or its side dish. One of these dishes is nasi kerabu, the name which literally means "rice with salad". One of the traditional types of salads made from vegetables and herbs in Malaysian cuisine under the name "kerabu".

In terms of its composition, nasi kerabu is similar to a number of other Malaysian national dish, in particular, nasi ulam, in which a portion of rice is also supplemented with vegetable salad and some other side dishes, and even considered as a kind of the latter. However, the fundamental value of nasi kerabu is the bright color of rice is achieved through the use of natural food coloring - flowers of the trifoliate clitoria (Clitoria ternatea), which is native to Southeast Asia.

Nasi kerabu is a traditional dish of the northeastern coast of West Malaysia, primarily in the states of Kelantan and Terrenganu, from where it spreads to the other regions of the country by the beginning of the 21st century, as well as to neighbouring Singapore. This dish is also very popular in the adjacent regions of southern Thailand, populated mainly by Malays, among whom there are separatist sentiments. Due to the latter circumstance, nasi kerabu is often perceived in this area not only as the most important culinary speciality, but also as one of the informal symbols of ethnic identity and connection with Malaysia. This point is reflected, in particular, in the book of Malaysian journalist, publicist and documentary filmmaker , Operation Nasi Kerabu: Finding Patani in an Islamic Insurgency. Among the Thai-speaking population of Southern Thailand, nasi kerabu is known by the name khao-yam.

Preparation and varieties

Nasi kerabu consists of several components: boiled rice, vegetable salad and at least one more, and more often several additions.  And if dyed rice is an essential part of this dish, then the salad and to an even greater extent, additional ingredients can vary quite widely, which ultimately creates a huge variety of varieties of nasi kerabu.

In water intended for boiling rice, several flowers of Clitoris trifoliate, fresh or dried, are soaked for several minutes, as a result of which it acquires a very intense blue color with a hint of indigo.  In addition, a certain set of Spices is added to the water, which usually consists of finely chopped stems of lemon grass, leaves of Kaffir lime and a  pandan plant, often - syzygium multiflora, ginger, and also palm sugar.  Sometimes coconut milk is added to the water.

Kerabu is a vegetable salad that is part of the dish, usually a mixture of no more than three or four ingredients: raw, soaked and, less often boiled. Most often, cucumbers, lettuce, cowpea, green beans, water spinach, bok choy, onions or green onions, cabbage, paprika, chili peppers, knotweed, bamboo sprouts or sprouted mungs are used for its preparation. The portion of the vegetable mixture added to the dish is usually no more than half the volume of a serving rice.

In addition to the vegetable mixture, some animal product is almost always added to Nasi kerabu: chicken, fish, seafood or meat. This part of the dish can be prepared in various ways: most often it is fried or stewed using some kind of sauces. 

Along with these products, or instead of rice, this dish often uses such Malaysian cuisine specialties such as solok lada - fried capsicum stuffed with grated flesh of a young coconut - and telur masin - duck or much more rarely, a chicken egg, aged in a special brine with spices. Usually, one or two stuffed peppers and half salted egg are served per serving Nasi kerabu: the latter, which has a slightly gelatinous consistency, is often placed on a plate right in the shell. In addition, rice and other components of the dish are often sprinkled with keropok.

Serving and drinking

All components of Nasi kerabu are laid out on one flat plate. A pile of rice is usually the central part of the "composition", but may also be located on the edge of the plate. Lettuce and other additives are laid out to the next rice, or in whole or in part - on top of it. This dish, like many other traditional Malaysian dishes, is often served with sambal. Sometimes - in particular, at a festive or restaurant serving - a nasi kerabu dish is decorated with fresh flowers of the trifoliate clitoris.

Nasi kerabu is main dish usually served hot or, more rarely, at room temperature. In West Malaysia, this dish is very popular in both home and street cuisine: it is prepared both in modern style restaurants and in many traditional taverns. A fast food, "portable" version of this dish can be purchased at markets or street vendors, which can be eaten on the go or taken as a food supply: a small portion of blue rice with a usually rather modest side dish is wrapped in paper or newspaper.

See also
List of Malay dishes
Nasi ulam
Nasi dagang
Nasi lemak

Notes

References

Bibliography

External links
Nasi kerabu recipe
Nasi kerabu recipe

Malay cuisine
Malaysian rice dishes
Thai cuisine